Charles Edward Coon (March 15, 1842 – August 1, 1920) was a Republican politician from the U.S. state of Washington. He served as the fifth Lieutenant Governor of Washington.

References

External links
 

Lieutenant Governors of Washington (state)
1842 births
1920 deaths